Tchibota is a village in Kouilou, Republic of the Congo.  The Vili people have a surname with the name Tchibota which originates from this town.  The population of the village and surrounding villages is 262,931.

References 

Kouilou Department
Populated places in the Republic of the Congo